The  Chicago Cardinals season was the team's 38th season in the National Football League. The Cardinals failed to improve on their previous year's record of 7–5, winning only three games. They failed to qualify for the playoffs (NFL title game) for the ninth consecutive season.

Schedule

Standings

References 

1957
Chicago Cardinals
Chicago Card